Manjari may refer to:

People
Manjari (Indian singer) (born 1986), Indian playback singer and Hindustani vocalist 
Manjari (Norwegian singer), participant in The Eurovision Song Contest in 1997
Manjari Bhargava (f. 1974), Indian diver
Manjari Chaturvedi, Indian Sufi Kathak dancer
Manjari Fadnis (born 1993), Indian actress
Manjari Joshi (born 1960), Indian TV newsreader/anchor
Manjari Makijany (born 1986/87), Indian writer, director and producer
Rupa Manjari (born 1990), Indian film actress
Shashank Manjari (1899-1987), Indian politician

Other uses
Manjari (word), Sanskrit word
Manjari (film), Nepali film featuring Sujata Koirala
Manjari railway station, station in Pune, India
Manjari, Pune, suburb of Pune, India, served by Manjari railway station

See also
Rathna Manjari, a 1962 Indian Kannada film
Swarna Manjari, a 1962 Telugu adventure fantasy film
  including people bearing the name